The Victoria Cup is the premier middle distance harness race of Australia. Conducted over 2575m, rather than the staying distance of over 3000m or the sprint distance of under 2000m, the Victoria Cup was run at the Melbourne Showgrounds up until 1975, when it was shifted to Moonee Valley. In 2009 the SEW Eurodrive Victoria Cup will be run at Harness Racing Victoria's new venue, Tabcorp Park at Melton. The race has been part of the Australasian Grand Circuit since 1987. Conducted in February from 1987 to 2003, the race is now conducted over two nights in December, alongside the Australasian Trotting Grand Prix.

The race record of 1.56.7 was set by Chokin (NZ) in 1994 when the race was run over 2380m. The race shifted to 2570m or 2575m due to a track upgrade. Double Identity in December 2003 held the record of a mile rate of 1.57.2 over the 2575m trip until Melpark Major's track record breaking performance of 1:55.8 in the 2008 event.

Race Winners
 1974  -  King's Mead  (Standing Start)
 1975  -  King Frost  (Standing Start)
 1976  -  Don't Retreat
 1977  -  Paleface Adios
 1978  -  Koala King
 1979  -  Koala King
 1980  -  Koala King
 1981  -  Frosty Imp
 1982  -  Popular Alm
 1983  -  Popular Alm
 1984  -  Preux Chevalier
 1985  -  Not Held
 1987 (Feb)  -  Bag Limit
 1988  -  Bag Limit
 1989  -  Sinbad Bay
 1990  -  Sovereign Cloud
 1991  -  Sinbad Bay
 1992  -  Franco Ice (NZ)
 1993  -  Master Musician (NZ)
 1994  -  Chokin (NZ)
 1995  -  Golden Reign
 1996  -  Desperate Comment (NZ)
 1997  -  Desperate Comment (NZ)
 1998  -  Brabham (NZ)
 1999  -  Holmes D G (NZ)
 2000  -  Breeny's Fella
 2001  -  Shakamaker
 2002  -  Jofess
 2003 (Feb)  -  Young Rufus (NZ)
 2003 (Dec)  -  Double Identity
 2004  -  Sokyola (NZ)
 2005  -  Be Good Johnny
 2006  -  Blacks A Fake
 2007  -  Robin Hood
 2008  -  Melpark Major
 2009  -  Bettor's Strike (NZ)
 2010  -  Mr Feelgood
 2011 - Smoken Up (NZ)
 2012 - Caribbean Blaster
 2013 - For A Reason
 2014 - no race
 2015 - Christen Me (NZ)
 2016 - Lennytheshark
 2017 - Lazarus  (NZ)
 2017 - Lennytheshark
 2018 - Tiger Tara (NZ)
 2019 - Bling It On
 2020 - Lochinvar Art
 2021 - Max Delight
 2022 - Rock N Roll Doo (NZ)

See also

 Miracle Mile Pace
 A G Hunter Cup
 Inter Dominion Pacing Championship
 New Zealand Trotting Cup
 Queensland Pacing Championship
 Harness racing in Australia
 Harness racing in New Zealand

References

External links
Official SEW-Eurodrive Victoria Cup Carnival Website

Harness races in Australia
Australasian Grand Circuit Races